Waite may refer to:

People
 Waite (name)
 An alternative spelling for Wait (musician)

Other
 Waite, Maine, a town in the United States
 Waite Research Precinct, located in the Adelaide suburb of Urrbrae, South Australia
 Waite Campus of the University of Adelaide, located within the Waite Research Precinct
 Electoral district of Waite, a state electoral district in South Australia

See also
 
 Wait (disambiguation)
 Justice Waite (disambiguation)